AdGreetz is a marketing services company based in Los Angeles, California, United States. It was founded in 2009 by Eric Frankel, who serves as the company's CEO.

Platform
The company uses adaptive video in its SaaS video personalization platform. Video messages are distributed through email, social media, websites, and banner ads.

AdGreetz has created videos for companies in various industries, including Flipkart and Forever 21. The campaigns are personalized to the ad viewers. The company also developed an email campaign for the film Fifty Shades of Grey, where recipients heard their name spoken through the voice of a character from the film. The company also created a campaign for the film Smurfs: The Lost Village.

In 2019, AdGreetz created the AdChef platform.

Awards
 2018 IDMA Silver Award for Most Effective Use of Digital Analytics
 2018 IDMA Bronze Award for Most Effective Use of AI for a Campaign and Business Optimisation

References

Companies based in California